Didogobius bentuvii, Ben-Tuvia's goby, is a species of goby native to the Mediterranean Sea along the coast of Israel where it can be found on muddy sand bottoms at around a depth of . Both the specific name and the common name honour the Israeli ichthyologist Adam Ben-Tuvia (1919-1999) of the Hebrew University of Jerusalem, who collected type and who has made a significant contribution to the knowledge of the Mediterranean fish fauna.

References

Didogobius
Fish of Western Asia
Fish of the Mediterranean Sea
Fish described in 1966